Loleta (Wiyot: Guduwalhat) is a census-designated place in Humboldt County, California. The population was 783 at the 2010 census. Residents live in a central community area and rural outskirts. There are two separate Native American reservations on the rural outskirts of Table Bluff, California.

The ZIP Code is 95551, and the community is inside area code 707.

Name
There is disagreement as to the origin of its name. One story is that its derived name, lalōekā, is the Wiyot name for the trail on the top of Table Bluff. Another story is that the name was derived from the Wiyot for   'Go F___ Yourself.' A third story is that the name is Wiyot for "Let's have intercourse."

History
European settlement began in the early 1850s although Wiyot people had inhabited the area for generations.  Potato farming was the biggest agricultural use of land until the 1870s, when depleted soil and declining prices caused a turn to dairying.  The town was originally known as Swauger or Swauger's Station, for local landowner Samuel A. Swauger.

The town was renamed Loleta in 1897.  The name was reported to mean "pleasant place at the end of the tide water" in the language of the original Wiyot native inhabitants, although this is apparently contradicted linguistically as well as by a hearsay account from the 1950s, made notorious by a National Geographic blog post. However, a 1918 list of place names collected by Kroeber and Waterman two years after Kroeber's 1916 publication shows that the trail from Table Bluff along the peak of that feature was named "lalōekā".

The Eel River and Eureka Railroad reached Swauger's Station from Humboldt Bay in 1883.  The Swauger post office opened in 1888, and changed its name to Loleta in 1898.  The Humboldt Creamery plant (originally Diamond Springs Creamery, eventually a co-operative of the Golden State Creamery) opened in the town proper in 1893, and dairying continues to be a major economic influence.  The Atchison, Topeka and Santa Fe Railway reorganized Loleta's railroad as the San Francisco and Northwestern Railway in 1903 and then completed the Northwestern Pacific Railroad to San Francisco in 1914.

Environment
Located  from the Eel River, which drains 10 percent of the total California watershed, and four miles from the Pacific Ocean and Humboldt Bay, fishing has also been a significant economic factor in the local economy.  In the early years of the 20th century, fish buyers from San Francisco congregated in Loleta every fall to bid on the salmon catch, which averaged $50,000.

There are two Humboldt County parks located near Loleta, generally to the west toward the Pacific Ocean: Crab County Park and Table Bluff County Park as well as several beach, dunes, and wetlands Public Land Areas.

The Aleutian Cackling Goose (Branta hutchinsii leucopareia) has in recent years extended its spring staging area to Loleta. Flocks of over 400 individual birds may be seen in March.

Demographics

The 2010 United States Census reported that Loleta had a population of 783. The racial makeup of Loleta was 643 (82.1%) White, 12 (1.5%) African American, 16 (2.0%) Native American, 5 (0.6%) Asian, 0 (0.0%) Pacific Islander, 65 (8.3%) from other races, and 42 (5.4%) from two or more races. Hispanic or Latino of any race were 114 persons (14.6%).

The Census reported that 783 people (100% of the population) lived in households, 0 (0%) lived in non-institutionalized group quarters, and 0 (0%) were institutionalized.

There were 314 households, out of which 96 (30.6%) had children under the age of 18 living in them, 135 (43.0%) were opposite-sex married couples living together, 34 (10.8%) had a female householder with no husband present, 12 (3.8%) had a male householder with no wife present.  There were 40 (12.7%) unmarried opposite-sex partnerships, and 4 (1.3%) same-sex married couples or partnerships. 97 households (30.9%) were made up of individuals, and 21 (6.7%) had someone living alone who was 65 years of age or older. The average household size was 2.49.  There were 181 families (57.6% of all households); the average family size was 3.17.

The population was spread out, with 186 people (23.8%) under the age of 18, 81 people (10.3%) aged 18 to 24, 207 people (26.4%) aged 25 to 44, 241 people (30.8%) aged 45 to 64, and 68 people (8.7%) who were 65 years of age or older.  The median age was 36.5 years. For every 100 females, there were 90.0 males.  For every 100 females age 18 and over, there were 83.7 males.

The homeowner vacancy rate was 2.7%; the rental vacancy rate was 4.2%.  460 people (58.7% of the population) lived in owner-occupied housing units and 323 people (41.3%) lived in rental housing units.
Native Americans represent about 2% of Loleta's population, according to the 2010 US census. Whites make up 82.1 percent of the population of 783 (less than the 807 inhabitants the census recorded in 1880).

Education
Loleta is the seat of the Loleta Union School District, and home of the Loleta Elementary School, a public K-8 school.

Economy
Although agriculture and dairy have been salient factors in Loleta's economy, most residents work outside the community in neighboring cities.

Downtown Loleta had a cheese factory which closed in December 2019, a grocery store, a meat market, a bakery (closed March 2014), a realty office, and a post office.   The Loleta Elementary school, two churches and the firefighter's pavilion, managed by local volunteer firefighters are closer to U.S. 101.

The Bear River Band of the Rohnerville Rancheria is headquartered in Loleta, where they operate the Bear River Casino.

Popular culture
Loleta and Eureka were locations for filming the 1982 horror movie, Halloween III: Season of the Witch; scenes inside "the Silver Shamrock Novelties factory" were filmed in a former milk bottling plant for Familiar Foods on Loleta Drive at Railroad Avenue.

"Drive," Season 6, Episode 2 of the hit show The X-files, features Loleta momentarily near the end of the episode.

Politics

Notable people
Seth Kinman, pioneer and hunter for Fort Humboldt
Northwest school artist Morris Graves lived in Loleta from 1964 until his death in 2001, in a house designed by Seattle architect Ibsen Nelson.

See also

 Humboldt Bay National Wildlife Refuge
 Humboldt Creamery
 Northwestern Pacific Railroad

References

Further reading
Parry, M.A. 1962. "The Loleta Record"in Humboldt County Historical Society Newsletter September 1962:4.
Parry, M.A. 1963. The History of Loleta, Humboldt State College. Thesis.
Loleta Chamber of Commerce. Loleta: A Town History. Pamphlet.

External links 
Loleta History Timeline

Census-designated places in Humboldt County, California
Census-designated places in California